The Canadian territory of Yukon has had a responsible government since 1978. In the 19th century, Yukon was a segment of the Hudson's Bay Company-administered North-Western Territory and then the Canadian-administered Northwest Territories. The territory only obtained a recognizable local government in 1895 when it became a separate district of the Northwest Territories. In 1898, Yukon was made a separate territory with its own commissioner and appointed Territorial Council. Prior to 1978, the territory had a legislature with a largely advisory role and no political parties or government leader. Instead, powers were invested in a governing Commissioner appointed by the federal government.

Yukon has had nine premiers since 1978, of which five were from the Yukon Party and its predecessor the Yukon Progressive Conservative Party, two were from the Yukon Liberal Party, and two were from the Yukon New Democratic Party. Yukon is the only province or territory in Canada that has never had a native-born premier. The Government of Yukon does not publish an official list of premiers. Listed here are the terms of serve as provided by the Parliament of Canada.

Premiers of Yukon

See also
 List of Yukon commissioners
 List of Yukon Leaders of Opposition

Footnotes

Notes

References

External links
 Premier of Yukon

Yukon

Premiers
Premiers